André Even (January 14, 1926 – October 10, 2009) was a French basketball player who competed in the 1948 Summer Olympics. He was part of the French basketball team, which won the silver medal.

References

External links
André Even's profile at databaseOlympics
André Even's profile at the Fédération Française de Basket-Ball 

1926 births
2009 deaths
French men's basketball players
Olympic basketball players of France
Basketball players at the 1948 Summer Olympics
Olympic silver medalists for France
Olympic medalists in basketball
Medalists at the 1948 Summer Olympics